The Haida ermine (Mustela haidarum) is a mustelid species endemic to a few islands off the Pacific Northwest of North America, namely Haida Gwaii in Canada and the southern Alexander Archipelago in the U.S. state of Alaska.

Indigenous names 
In the Haida language, this species is known as daayáats’ in its brown summer coat and tlag in its winter coat.

Taxonomy 
The three subspecies comprising this species were originally considered subspecies of Mustela erminea, but in 2013 they were recognized as distinct from any other ermine, and a 2021 study found them to together comprise a distinct species. M. haidarum is thought have originated about 375,000 years ago (during the Pleistocene), and is thought to be a result of ancient hybrid speciation between the Beringian ermine (M. erminea) and American ermine (M. richardsonii). The islands are thought to been glacial refugia during the Last Glacial Maximum, with both species of ermine being isolated on the islands and hybridizing with one another while the ice sheets isolated them from the rest of the world, thus leading to the formation of a new species. It is recognized as a distinct species by the American Society of Mammalogists.

Distribution 
The species is found on a few islands off the coast of British Columbia and southeast Alaska. In Canada, it is found on the Haida Gwaii archipelago in Graham and Moresby islands, while in Alaska it is found on Prince of Wales Island and possibly Suemez Island. It is found in a temperate rainforest habitat.

Description 
Aside from genetic differences, M. haidarum can be distinguished from M. erminea and M. richardsonii by its elongated skull.

Subspecies 
Three subspecies are thought to exist.

Conservation 
The habitat for the Haida ermine has been intensively reduced over the past few centuries due to old-growth timber harvest in the Tongass National Forest, an important protected area for the species, as well as industrial-scale mining on the islands, which disproportionately affects insular endemics such as M. haidarum. Expanding human populations and increasing tourism may increase the risk of pathogen spillover to M. haidarum, including pathogens common to pets such as canine distemper and parvoviruses, which have negatively impacted other wild mustelids. Due to the rudimentary understanding of the true level of endemism in these northern archipelagos, these threats must be better quantified to protect species from them. The Pacific martens (M. caurina) inhabiting Haida Gwaii also represent a distinct lineage from other populations, indicating that the habitat of the islands may have allowed other distinct species or subspecies to evolve.

References 

Weasels
Mammals of Canada
Mammals of the United States
Endemic fauna of the Pacific Northwest
Mammals described in 1898
Extant Pleistocene first appearances
Taxa named by Edward Alexander Preble